Kung Fu Rabbit is a platform video game for the Android, iOS, Nintendo 3DS, PlayStation 3, PlayStation Vita and Wii U. It was developed by French team cTools Studio for mobile platforms and ported by Neko Entertainment for consoles. It features a white rabbit who teaches kung fu in the temple of rabbits. When the Universal Evil kidnaps all of his students, he goes on a quest to save them. The 3DS version was released on February 20, 2014 in North America and Europe, and in Japan on October 8.

Reception

Kung Fu Rabbit received mixed reviews from critics upon release. On Metacritic, the game holds scores of 65/100 for the 3DS version based on 6 reviews, 70/100 for the iOS version based on 10 reviews, 72/100 for the PS Vita version based on 5 reviews, and 65/100 for the Wii U version based on 14 reviews.

Awards
 Number 2 from Pocket Gamer Awards 2012

References

2012 video games
IOS games
Windows games
Wii U eShop games
Indie video games
PlayStation 3 games
PlayStation Vita games
Neko Entertainment games
Nintendo 3DS eShop games
PlayStation Network games
Android (operating system) games
Video games about rabbits and hares
Video games developed in France
BulkyPix games